The 2020 Purdue Boilermakers baseball team was a baseball team that represented Purdue University in the 2020 NCAA Division I baseball season. The Boilermakers were members of the Big Ten Conference and played their home games at Alexander Field in West Lafayette, Indiana. They were led by first-year head coach Greg Goff.

The season was cut short in stages by March 12 due to the COVID-19 pandemic.

Previous season
The Boilermakers finished the 2019 NCAA Division I baseball season 20–34 overall (7–16 conference) and twelfth place in conference standings, failing to quality for the 2019 Big Ten Conference baseball tournament

MLB draft 
The following Boilermakers on the 2019 roster were selected in the 2019 Major League Baseball draft:

* indicates draftee had no more college eligibility

Preseason
On June 11, 2019, head coach Mark Wasikowski left the Purdue program to return to Oregon as the head coach. Just two days later, Purdue promoted volunteer assistant, Greg Goff to head coach. On June 19, 2019, Goff named Campbell pitching coach and recruiting coordinator, Chris Marx, the team's pitching coach. On September 5, 2019, former Purdue shortstop, Harry Shipley was named a volunteer assistant coach.

Roster

Schedule

! style="" | Regular Season
|- valign="top" 

|- bgcolor="#ccffcc"
| 1 || February 14 || vs  || Historic Sanford Memorial Stadium • Sanford, Florida, || 9–6 || Parker (1–0) || Joyce (0–1) || Hofstra (1) || 156 || 1–0 || –
|- bgcolor="#ffcccc"
| 2 || February 15 || vs Hofstra || Historic Sanford Memorial Stadium • Sanford, Florida || 6–13 || Hall (1–0) || Tomasic (0–1) || None || 259 || 1–1 || –
|- bgcolor="#ccffcc"
| 3 || February 15 || vs Hofstra || Historic Sanford Memorial Stadium • Sanford, Florida || 10–4 || Brooks (1–0) || Mundy (0–1) || None || 259 || 2–1 || –
|- bgcolor="#ccffcc"
| 4 || February 16 || vs Hofstra || Historic Sanford Memorial Stadium • Sanford, Florida || 10–9 || Wade (1–0) || Skidmore (0–1) || Hoftstra (2) || 252 || 3–1 || –
|- bgcolor="#ccffcc"
| 5 || February 21 || at  || Jim Perry Stadium • Buies Creek, North Carolina, || 6–4 || Johnson (1–0) || Cowan (0–2) || Hofstra (3) || 506 || 4–1 || –
|- bgcolor="#ccffcc"
| 6 || February 22 || vs  || Jim Perry Stadium • Buies Creek, North Carolina || 6–2 || Brooks (2–0) || Pushard (0–1) || Bohm (1) || 273 || 5–1 || –
|- bgcolor="#ccffcc"
| 7 || February 23 || vs  || Jim Perry Stadium • Buies Creek, North Carolina || 7–1 || Smeltz (1–0) || Siegenthaler (0–1) || None || 158 || 6–1 || –
|- bgcolor="#ffcccc"
| 8 || February 28 || vs #14  || U.S. Bank Stadium • Minneapolis, Minnesota, || 1–5 || Jarvis (2–1) || Johnson (0–1) || None || – || 6–2 || –
|- bgcolor="#ffcccc"
| 9 || February 29 || vs #8 NC State || U.S. Bank Stadium • Minneapolis, Minnesota || 0–6 || Swiney (3–0) || Brooks (2–1) || None || – || 6–3 || –
|-

|- bgcolor="#ffcccc"
| 10 || March 1 || vs #23  || U.S. Bank Stadium • Minneapolis, Minnesota || 5–6 || Mott (2–0) || Hildebrand (0–1) || None || – || 6–4 || –
|- bgcolor="#ffcccc"
| 11 || March 4 || at Indiana || Bart Kaufman Field • Bloomington, Indiana || 2–17 || Krueger (1–0) || Bohm (0–1) || None || 1,668 || 6–5 || –
|- bgcolor="#ffcccc"
| 12 || March 6 || at  || Nick Denes Field • Bowling Green, Kentucky, || 3–8 || Hicks (2–1) || Hofstra (0–1) || Kates (1) || 213 || 6–6 || –
|- bgcolor="#ffcccc"
| 13 || March 7 || at Western Kentucky || Nick Denes Field • Bowling Green, Kentucky || 2–11 || Bergeron (2–0) || Brooks (2–2) || None || 403 || 6–7 || –
|- bgcolor="#ccffcc"
| 14 || March 8 || at Western Kentucky || Nick Denes Field • Bowling Green, Kentucky || 19–1 || Jackson (1–0) || Shoemake (2–1) || None || 438 || 7–7 || –
|- bgcolor="#bbbbbb"
| 15 || March 13 || at  || Charles H. Braun Stadium • Evansville, Indiana || colspan=7| Canceled (COVID-19 pandemic)
|- bgcolor="#bbbbbb"
| 16 || March 14 || at Evansville || Charles H. Braun Stadium • Evansville, Indiana || colspan=7| Canceled (COVID-19 pandemic)
|- bgcolor="#bbbbbb"
| 17 || March 15 || at Evansville || Charles H. Braun Stadium • Evansville, Indiana || colspan=7| Canceled (COVID-19 pandemic)
|- bgcolor="#bbbbbb"
| 18 || March 17 ||  || Alexander Field • West Lafayette, Indiana || colspan=7| Canceled (COVID-19 pandemic)
|- bgcolor="#bbbbbb"
| 19 || March 18 ||  || Alexander Field • West Lafayette, Indiana || colspan=7| Canceled (COVID-19 pandemic)
|- bgcolor="#bbbbbb"
| 20 || March 20 || at Michigan || Ray Fisher Stadium • Ann Arbor, Michigan, || colspan=7| Canceled (COVID-19 pandemic)
|- bgcolor="#bbbbbb"
| 21 || March 21 || at Michigan || Ray Fisher Stadium • Ann Arbor, Michigan || colspan=7| Canceled (COVID-19 pandemic)
|- bgcolor="#bbbbbb"
| 22 || March 22 || at Michigan || Ray Fisher Stadium • Ann Arbor, Michigan || colspan=7| Canceled (COVID-19 pandemic)
|- bgcolor="#bbbbbb"
| 23 || March 24 || Purdue Fort Wayne || Alexander Field • West Lafayette, Indiana || colspan=7| Canceled (COVID-19 pandemic)
|- bgcolor="#bbbbbb"
| 24 || March 25 || at  || Bob Warn Field at Sycamore Stadium • Terre Haute, Indiana || colspan=7| Canceled (COVID-19 pandemic)
|- bgcolor="#bbbbbb"
| 25 || March 27 ||  || Alexander Field • West Lafayette, Indiana || colspan=7| Canceled (COVID-19 pandemic)
|- bgcolor="#bbbbbb"
| 26 || March 28 || Illinois || Alexander Field • West Lafayette, Indiana || colspan=7| Canceled (COVID-19 pandemic)
|- bgcolor="#bbbbbb"
| 27 || March 28 || Illinois || Alexander Field • West Lafayette, Indiana || colspan=7| Canceled (COVID-19 pandemic)
|- bgcolor="#bbbbbb"
| 28 || March 31 ||  || Alexander Field • West Lafayette, Indiana || colspan=7| Canceled (COVID-19 pandemic)
|-

|- bgcolor="#bbbbbb"
| 29 || April 3 || at  || Duane Banks Field • Iowa City, Iowa || colspan=7| Canceled (COVID-19 pandemic)
|- bgcolor="#bbbbbb"
| 30 || April 4 || at Iowa || Duane Banks Field • Iowa City, Iowa || colspan=7| Canceled (COVID-19 pandemic)
|- bgcolor="#bbbbbb"
| 31 || April 5 || at Iowa || Duane Banks Field • Iowa City, Iowa || colspan=7| Canceled (COVID-19 pandemic)
|- bgcolor="#bbbbbb"
| 32 || April 7 || at  || Ball Diamond • Muncie, Indiana || colspan=7| Canceled (COVID-19 pandemic)
|- bgcolor="#bbbbbb"
| 33 || April 10 ||  || Alexander Field • West Lafayette, Indiana || colspan=7| Canceled (COVID-19 pandemic)
|- bgcolor="#bbbbbb"
| 34 || April 11 || Nebraska || Alexander Field • West Lafayette, Indiana || colspan=7| Canceled (COVID-19 pandemic)
|- bgcolor="#bbbbbb"
| 35 || April 12 || Nebraska || Alexander Field • West Lafayette, Indiana || colspan=7| Canceled (COVID-19 pandemic)
|- bgcolor="#bbbbbb"
| 36 || April 14 ||  || Alexander Field • West Lafayette, Indiana || colspan=7| Canceled (COVID-19 pandemic)
|- bgcolor="#bbbbbb"
| 37 || April 17 ||  || Alexander Field • West Lafayette, Indiana || colspan=7| Canceled (COVID-19 pandemic)
|- bgcolor="#bbbbbb"
| 38 || April 18 || Samford || Alexander Field • West Lafayette, Indiana || colspan=7| Canceled (COVID-19 pandemic)
|- bgcolor="#bbbbbb"
| 39 || April 19 || Samford || Alexander Field • West Lafayette, Indiana || colspan=7| Canceled (COVID-19 pandemic)
|- bgcolor="#bbbbbb"
| 40 || April 21 || Ball State || Alexander Field • West Lafayette, Indiana || colspan=7| Canceled (COVID-19 pandemic)
|- bgcolor="#bbbbbb"
| 41 || April 22 || vs Butler || Victory Field • Indianapolis, Indiana || colspan=7| Canceled (COVID-19 pandemic)
|- bgcolor="#bbbbbb"
| 42 || April 24 || at Minnesota || Siebert Field • Minneapolis, Minnesota || colspan=7| Canceled (COVID-19 pandemic)
|- bgcolor="#bbbbbb"
| 43 || April 25 || at Minnesota || Siebert Field • Minneapolis, Minnesota || colspan=7| Canceled (COVID-19 pandemic)
|- bgcolor="#bbbbbb"
| 44 || April 26 || at Minnesota || Siebert Field • Minneapolis, Minnesota || colspan=7| Canceled (COVID-19 pandemic)
|- bgcolor="#bbbbbb"
| 45 || April 28 ||  || Alexander Field • West Lafayette, Indiana || colspan=7| Canceled (COVID-19 pandemic)
|-

|- bgcolor="#bbbbbb"
| 46 || May 1 ||  || Alexander Field • West Lafayette, Indiana || colspan=7| Canceled (COVID-19 pandemic)
|- bgcolor="#bbbbbb"
| 47 || May 2 || Maryland || Alexander Field • West Lafayette, Indiana || colspan=7| Canceled (COVID-19 pandemic)
|- bgcolor="#bbbbbb"
| 48 || May 3 || Maryland || Alexander Field • West Lafayette, Indiana || colspan=7| Canceled (COVID-19 pandemic)
|- bgcolor="#bbbbbb"
| 49 || May 8 || Indiana || Alexander Field • West Lafayette, Indiana || colspan=7| Canceled (COVID-19 pandemic)
|- bgcolor="#bbbbbb"
| 50 || May 9 || Indiana || Alexander Field • West Lafayette, Indiana || colspan=7| Canceled (COVID-19 pandemic)
|- bgcolor="#bbbbbb"
| 51 || May 10 || Indiana || Alexander Field • West Lafayette, Indiana || colspan=7| Canceled (COVID-19 pandemic)
|- bgcolor="#bbbbbb"
| 52 || May 12 || at Milwaukee || Routine Field • Franklin, Wisconsin || colspan=7| Canceled (COVID-19 pandemic)
|- bgcolor="#bbbbbb"
| 53 || May 14 || at  || Drayton McLane Baseball Stadium at John H. Kobs Field • East Lansing, Michigan, || colspan=7| Canceled (COVID-19 pandemic)
|- bgcolor="#bbbbbb"
| 54 || May 15 || at Michigan State || Drayton McLane Baseball Stadium at John H. Kobs Field • East Lansing, Michigan || colspan=7| Canceled (COVID-19 pandemic)
|- bgcolor="#bbbbbb"
| 55 || May 16 || at Michigan State || Drayton McLane Baseball Stadium at John H. Kobs Field • East Lansing, Michigan || colspan=7| Canceled (COVID-19 pandemic)
|-

References

Purdue
Purdue Boilermakers baseball seasons
Purdue